"If the Jukebox Took Teardrops" may refer to one of two songs:

"If the Jukebox Took Teardrops", by Billy Joe Royal from the album Out of the Shadows
"If the Jukebox Took Teardrops", by Mike Henderson from the album Country Music Made Me Do It; also recorded by Danni Leigh on the album 29 Nights